is a Japanese tokusatsu television series produced by Toei Company. It ran for 53 episodes from January 20, 1991 to January 26, 1992 on TV Asahi. It is part of the Metal Hero Series franchise; a sequel to Special Rescue Police Winspector, it is the second series in the Rescue Police Series trilogy.

Plot
After the Winspector police team leaves Japan to fight crime in France, Chief Shunsuke Masaki realizes he must create a new police team to defend Tokyo from crime. He creates Solbrain – a high-tech special rescue force, expert in missions requiring rescue and firepower. Its leader is Daiki Nishio, a rookie detective who can use the Plus Up command in his car to transform into SolBraver. Other members are Reiko Higuchi, also able to use the Plus Up command to transform into SolJeanne, SolBraver's female counterpart; and SolDozer, a yellow bulldozer robot. Later in the series, the Winspector team returns to Japan and teams up with Solbrain for a three-part story (episodes 21-23). From episode 34 on, Ryouma, the protagonist from Winspector, returns as a member of Solbrain, wearing a suit dubbed the Knight Fire.

The team
: Daiki is Ryoma's successor. He wears blue armor, and his primary vehicle is SolGallop. He is armed with Cerberus Delta (a triangular gun), which can transform into a rod or a sword.  
: Reiko is Junko's successor. She wears red armor, a black-and-white flameproof suit and a helmet without a mouthplate (so she can wear also an oxygen mask). Her primary vehicle is SolDrecker (exactly like Pepper Potts and Iron Man), which also carries Dozer. Her transformation call is also , and her weapon is a small gun. 
: Dozer is Bycle's and Walter's successor. He is a yellow heavy-duty robot (with design elements from a bulldozer, as the name implies) and can transform into a rescue machine.

Other members
: A Solbrain member, unlike Daiki and Reiko he does not wear a solid suit; however, he is always in action. 
: Chief of Solbrain. Compassionate and dedicated, he usually goes into the battlefield to help his subordinates. 
: A machine expert, he is Nonoyama's successor. 
: A pilot of the mothership Solid States-I, he leads the mothership's operating team and is senior to Daiki.
: Solbrain's Operation's team leader, she sees computer literacy as a main duty.
: Winspector's former leader, he first reappears in episode 21 with the Winspector team (robots Walter and Bikel) chasing an android named Messiah. He later transformed into Fire and helped the team with Walter and Bikel. Later returns in episode 34 as Knight Fire, a new member of Solbrain, armed with Cerberus Delta and Pile Tornado. He is portrayed by Masaru Yamashita, reprising his role from the previous Metal Hero series.
: Solbrain's supercomputer, and Madocks' successor.

Arsenal
: Daiki, Reiko and Ryōma's armor.
Proto Suit ( プロトスーツ, Puroto Suutsu ? ) The prototype of SolBraver's Solid Suit,  steals the armor to destroy SolBraver, but the armor had a timeout, similar to the Crush Tector's 5 minute time limit. Sasamoto was known as a psychotic person who had no qualifications to become the SolBraver.
: Daiki's car, based on the Toyota Sera
: Reiko's car, sometimes also driven by Jun. Based on the Toyota Previa
: Ryōma's car, based on the Mazda RX-7 FC
Masaki's undercover car: Chief Masaki's car. Initially, a Third-Generation Mazda Luce seen on Winspector, but in mid-series changed to a Mazda Persona.
: In the episode 21, when Ryoma chases an android, he drives this car, a tenth generation Cadillac Eldorado with all the equipment and transformation mechanisms installed inside the car.
: the mothership (abbreviated ).
: SolBraver and Knight Fire's weapon.
: a tool which shoots a special carbon-fiber rope or a special bullet
: Daiki and Reiko's police license
: oxygen cylinder
: emergency equipment used by SolJeanne
: handcuffs 
: the only weapon Solbrain inherited from Winspector (see Tokkei Winspector for details).
: SolBraver and Knight Fire's big gun, with three functions:
: shoots a fire-extinguishing beam
: shoots a special gelatinous, gluey, freezing bullet
: a hail of 40 plasma-energy bullets per second, fired by Cerberus Delta. Its power is two times that of GigaStreamer's maximum mode (when SolBraver and Knight Fire fire it at the same time, its power is four times GigaStreamer's).

Episodes
 : written by Noboru Sugimura, directed by Masao Minowa
 : written by Noboru Sugimura, directed by Masao Minowa
 : written by Noboru Sugimura, directed by Michio Konishi
 : written by Noboru Sugimura, directed by Michio Konishi
 : written by Takahiko Masuda, directed by Takeshi Ogasawara
 : written by Nobuo Ogizawa, directed by Takeshi Ogasawara
 : written by Kyoko Sagiyama, directed by Kaneharu Mitsumura
 : written by Takashi Yamada, directed by Kaneharu Mitsumura
 : written by Junichi Miyashita, directed by Michio Konishi
 : written by Nobuo Ogizawa, directed by Michio Konishi
 : written by Takahiko Masuda, directed by Takeshi Ogasawara
 : written by Noboru Sugimura, directed by Takeshi Ogasawara
 : written by Noboru Sugimura, directed by Kiyoshi Arai
 : written by Takashi Yamada, directed by Kiyoshi Arai
 : written by Susumu Takaku, directed by Michio Konishi
 : written by Noboru Sugimura, directed by Michio Konishi
 : written by Junichi Miyashita, directed by Takeshi Ogasawara
 : written by Kyoko Sagiyama, directed by Takeshi Ogasawara
 : written by Nobuo Ogizawa, directed by Hidenori Ishida
 : written by Takashi Yamada, directed by Hidenori Ishida
 : written by Noboru Sugimura, directed by Kaneharu Mitsumura
 : written by Noboru Sugimura, directed by Kaneharu Mitsumura
 : written by Noboru Sugimura, directed by Kaneharu Mitsumura
 : written by Susumu Takaku, directed by Michio Konishi
 : written by Noboru Sugimura, directed by Takeshi Ogasawara
 : written by Nobuo Ogizawa, directed by Michio Konishi
 : written by Kyoko Sagiyama, directed by Takeshi Ogasawara
 : written by Noboru Sugimura, directed by Kaneharu Mitsumura
 : written by Takashi Yamada, directed by Kaneharu Mitsumura
 : written by Nobuo Ogizawa, directed by Michio Konishi
 : written by Nobuo Ogizawa, directed by Michio Konishi
 : written by Susumu Takaku, directed by Takeshi Ogasawara
 : written by Junichi Miyashita, directed by Takeshi Ogasawara
 : written by Noboru Sugimura, directed by Michio Konishi
 : written by Noboru Sugimura, directed by Michio Konishi
 : written by Noboru Sugimura, directed by Kaneharu Mitsumura
 : written by Junichi Miyashita, directed by Kaneharu Mitsumura
 : written by Susumu Takaku, directed by Takeshi Ogasawara
 : written by Kyoko Sagiyama, directed by Takeshi Ogasawara 
 : written by Noboru Sugimura, directed by Kaneharu Mitsumura
 : written by Takahiko Masuda, directed by Kaneharu Mitsumura
 : written by Junichi Miyashita and Yasuyuki Suzuki, directed by Michio Konishi
 : written by Noboru Sugimura, directed by Michio Konishi
 : written by Nobuo Ogizawa, directed by Takeshi Ogasawara
 : written by Junichi Miyashita and Yasuyuki Suzuki, directed by Takeshi Ogasawara
 : written by Noboru Sugimura, directed by Kaneharu Mitsumura
 : written by Nobuo Ogizawa, directed by Kaneharu Mitsumura
 : written by Kyoko Sagiyama, directed by Michio Konishi
 : written by Noboru Sugimura and Akiko Asatsuke, directed by Michio Konishi
 : written by Mayumi Ishiyama and Junichi Miyashita, directed by Takeshi Ogasawara
 : written by Noboru Sugimura, directed by Takeshi Ogasawara
 : written by Noboru Sugimura, directed by Michio Konishi
 : written by Noboru Sugimura, directed by Michio Konishi

Video game
A video game for Tokkyū Shirei Solbrain was released in 1991 for the Famicom, published by Angel and developed by Natsume. It was localized into Shatterhand, which was published by Jaleco for the Nintendo Entertainment System in North America and Europe shortly after the Japanese release. The differences are mainly cosmetic (changing music and graphics) but there were also several substantial changes, such as which boss appeared in which area. In addition, the theme-park stage from the Famicom version was replaced with a nuclear-submarine stage in the NES version.

Cast
 - 
 - 
Reiko Higuchi (child - ep. 11): Miho Tamura
 - (voice)
 - 
 - 
 - 
 - 
 - 
 - 
 - 
 - 
 - Koji Matoba, Takeshi Ishida, Tokio Iwata, Emiko Takahashi and Kimiko Imai
(voice)/ - 
 -

Guest Stars
Dr.Inagaki (1): Shinya Ono
Kazuo Inagaki (1): Hirofumi Taga
Simulated Brain A320 (1 - voice): Yoshio Kawai
Ryuzo Makimura (2): Katsuhiko Kobayashi
Emi Makimura (2): Miki Takahashi
Rumi Makimura (2): Masami Hosoi
Yuka Mizusawa (2): Yoko Honna
Dr. Shibuzawa (3): Toshimichi Takahashi
Hatta (3): Koji Takahashi
Jun Tashiro (3): Shiro Saito
Kenta Tashiro (3): Mitsunari Hashimoto
Yukio Sano (4): Ryosuke Kaizu
Sano's minion (4): Kazuhiko Shimizu
Aoyama Electric Officer (4): Daisaku Shinohara
Aoyama Electric Researcher (4): Koji Imai
Game Machime Monster (4 - voices): Toku Nishio, Kaoru Shinoda
Koichi Ishikawa/Phanton Bond (5): Ritsuo Ishiyama
Yasuhiko Kujo (5): Maroshi Tamura
Naoto Yamaguchi (5): Shogo Kudo
Naoto's mother (5): Noriko Ikeda
Yumi Saiga (5): Mayumi Yoshida
Shinichiro Ishimaru/Kinta Kinentei (6): Kintoli Sanyutei
Shigeko Ishimaru (6): Sayoko Tanimoto
Kumagai Family (6)
Hanji Kumagai: Yutaka Oyama
Teruichi Kumagai: Yuji Okada
Tokuko Kumagai: Sayako Satake
Jingoro Makino (7): Tadayoshi Ueda
Masaru Makino (7): Kenzo Miyake
Kasai (7): Hironobu Kasahara
Saeki (7): Yuji Terada
Katsuhiko Sakamoto/Proto Solbraver (8): Junichi Haruta
Mamoru Okayama (8): Hiroshi Fuji

Suit Actors
 Solbraver: Kazutoshi Yokoyama and Tokio Iwata
 SolJeanne: Emiko Takahashi
 Soldozer: Toshiyuki Kikuchi
 Knight Fire: Hiroshi Maeda, Jiro Okamoto and Tokio Iwata

Crew
Original story by Saburo Yatsude
Screenplay by: Noboru Sugimura, Nobuo Ōgizawa, Takahiko Masuda, Junichi Miyashita, Susumu Takaku, Takashi Yamada, Kyōko Sagiyama, Mayumi Ishiyama, Akiko Asatsuke
Music: Kaoru Mizuki
Photography: Susumu Seo, Takakazu Koizumi
Assistant Director: Hidenori Ishida, Masashi Taniguchi
Action Directors: Junji Yamaoka, Jun Murakami
Special-Effects Director: Nobuo Yajima
Produced by: Kyōzō Utsunomiya, Atsushi Kaji (TV Asahi), Nagafumi Hori (Toei)
Directed by: Masao Minowa, Michio Konishi, Takeshi Ogasawara, Kaneharu Mitsumura, Kiyoshi Arai, Hidenori Ishida
Production: TV Asahi, ASATSU, Toei

Songs
Opening theme

Lyrics: 
Composition: 
Arrangement: 
Artist: 
Chorus: 
Closing theme

Lyrics: Akira Ōtsu
Composition: Kisaburō Suzuki
Arrangement: Tatsumi Yano
Artist: Takayuki Miyauchi
Chorus: Morinoki Jidō Gasshōdan

International Broadcasts and Home Video
Super Rescue Solbrain was aired on TV in the Philippines with all episodes dubbed into English but later replaced by Filipino in the late 1990's. It was also released on DVD. This is reported to be one of the few Metal Heroes series to ever be given an English dub.
The series aired in Indonesia on Indosiar with an Indonesian dub in the mid-1990s.
It also aired in Thailand on Channel 3 with a Thai dub.
In Brazil, the series aired as Super Equipe de Resgate Solbrain on the now-defunct Rede Manchete in 1995 with a Brazilian Portuguese dub.
The series received a Latin Spanish dub dubbed in Mexico with its' dub produced by Comarex dubbed by Larsa Studios, recorded and released in 1996. It aired as Super Rescate Solbrain.

References

External links

Fictional police officers
Japanese science fiction television series
Metal Hero Series
1991 Japanese television series debuts
1992 Japanese television series endings
Sequel television series
TV Asahi original programming
Television series set in 2000